Clelland F. Dodds (September 27, 1826 - July 27, 1894) was the second mayor of Bloomington, Indiana after its reincorporation.

The youngest child of Samuel and Rachel (Rheinhart) Dodds, he was born and lived on the Dodds homestead a mile south of Bloomington.  At the age of 21, he formed a short-lived partnership with A. Helton in dry goods.  In 1857, he returned to the family farm, but once again moved to Bloomington to open an insurance and real estate office.

In 1865 he was elected County Commissioner, and also served for two years as Perry Township Trustee.  He was elected mayor in 1878 to fill out the term of C.W. Henderson, and was re-elected at least three times for two-year terms.

On July 31, 1851, Dodds married the former Mary E. Orchard, and they had twelve children.

Mayors of Bloomington, Indiana
1826 births
1894 deaths